Louis Greatorex (born 30 December 1996) is a British actor from Duffield, Derbyshire. His television credits include the BBC1 drama series Last Tango in Halifax, in which he has played Lawrence Elliot since 2012.

Life and career
Greatorex is from Duffield, Derbyshire, the son of an IT professional and an HR administrator. He has one younger brother. Louis attended secondary school at the Ecclesbourne School in Duffield. From a young age Greatorex attended local drama workshops, including the Nottingham branch of the Central Junior Television Workshop. His theatre experience whilst attending the television workshop includes a role in a pantomime production of Peter Pan, and portraying the title role in a production of The Ritual Slaughter of Gorge Mastromas at Nottingham Contemporary. Greatorex also has experience of street theatre, having been named 'miming champion' at the Derby Arts festival in 2010.

He made his professional television debut in a 2010 episode of the situation comedy series The Legend of Dick and Dom. He also had a small role in the romantic comedy film My Last Five Girlfriends, which was released in 2009. Greatorex has portrayed the character of Lawrence in Last Tango in Halifax since 2012. He was put forward for his audition by the Central Junior Television Workshop, though almost missed the audition due to suffering from flu and losing his voice. He had to be persuaded by his family to attend the audition and did not expect to win the part due to symptoms of his illness.

As of 2015, Greatorex had signed with a London-based casting agency. In January 2015 he stated that he would like to pursue an acting career alongside his further education, having applied to study English Literature in 2015.

Filmography

Film

Television

References

External links

English male television actors
English male film actors
Male actors from Derbyshire
Living people
1996 births
People from Duffield
21st-century English male actors
English male child actors